The Arabian catshark (Bythaelurus alcockii) is a catshark of the family Scyliorhinidae. It is only known from a single specimen, now lost, which was found on the continental slope of the Arabian Sea.

References

Arabian catshark
Marine fauna of Western Asia
Arabian catshark